Gülchö Game Reserve is a protected area in Alay District, Osh Region, Kyrgyzstan. It was established in 1968 with a purpose of conservation of sea-buckthorn inhabited by pheasant.

References
 

Game reserves in Kyrgyzstan
Protected areas established in 1968